Frederick Edward T. Walter Bevan (27 February 1879 – 1935) was an English footballer who played in the Football League for Manchester City, Bury, Fulham, Derby County and Clapton Orient.

References

1879 births
1935 deaths
Footballers from Poplar, London
Association football forwards
English footballers
Millwall F.C. players
Manchester City F.C. players
Reading F.C. players
Queens Park Rangers F.C. players
Bury F.C. players
Fulham F.C. players
Derby County F.C. players
Leyton Orient F.C. players
Chatham Town F.C. players
English Football League players